St. Luke's Church, Glossop is an Anglican church in Glossop, Derbyshire, England.

History
The current building was dedicated on St. Luke's day (18 October) 1906 by the Bishop of Derby. It was built at a cost of £4,000 and was the gift of Mrs. S. Wood of Moorfield.

Parish
Along with St James' Church Glossop, it makes up Whitfield Parish Glossop within the Diocese of Derby. and is in the evangelical tradition.

The minister-in-charge of St. Luke's from January 2004 to January 2010 was the Rev'd Dr Terry Clark. From September 2010 the Associate Minister with responsibility for the St. Luke's Congregation is the Rev'd Brian Magorrian.

References

External links
main site
 Glossop Heritage Centre website  - Contains a brief history of the Church and other Glossop buildings.

Glossop
Glossop
Glossop
1906 establishments in England